Too Much Weekend is a studio album by American bluesman Gary B.B. Coleman. The album was released on July 27, 1992 by Ichiban Records label. This is his seventh and final album for Ichiban. Too Much Weekend was re-released on CD on December 13, 2010.

Track listing

Personnel
Gary B.B. Coleman – guitar, keyboards, lead vocals, producer
Lebron Scott – bass
Bryan Cole – drums
Jerry McCain – harmonica (tracks: 5)
Steve McRay – keyboards (additional)
Ted Dortch – saxophone
Ernie Baker – trumpet

References

1992 albums
Gary B. B. Coleman albums
Ichiban Records albums